Stanislav Loban (born 15 February 1977 in Odessa) is a retired Ukrainian footballer who played as a forward.

Honors
 FC Baku
Azerbaijan Premier League
Winner (1): 2005–06

External links

Profile at football.odessa.ua website
Profile at FC Dniestr website

1977 births
Living people
Ukrainian footballers
FC Stal Kamianske players
FC Podillya Khmelnytskyi players
FC Baku players
Ukrainian expatriate footballers
Expatriate footballers in Azerbaijan
Association football forwards
Footballers from Odesa